Hilarographa mechanica is a species of moth of the family Tortricidae. It is found in Assam, India.

References

Moths described in 1909
Hilarographini